Broken String Band is a folk rock band founded in 2015 in the city of Nashville, TN by Sean Patrick Stephansen and Taylor Thompson. Influenced by the likes of the Avett Brothers and the Lumineers, the group describes themselves as a group that "...excites your senses with thrashing banjos, iconic harmonies, stompy percussion, sentimental lyricism, and a live energy that provides appropriate extremes of ups and downs for a show that is as electrifying as it is moving.". The group later moved to Athens, GA and added the rhythm section of Laura Camacho and John Phillips from the Argentine Tango music group, the Athens Tango Project, Quentin Smith as a second double bass player, and Adam Poulin on violin.

The group has released an EP titled Prologue: Somebody's Daughter that features Sean Patrick Stephansen on banjo and vocals, Taylor Thompson on guitar and vocals, Laura Camacho on upright bass, John Phillips on percussion, and Teresa Grynia on violin.

Discography
 Prologue: Somebody's Daughter (2017)

References

Musical groups from Georgia (U.S. state)
Musicians from Athens, Georgia
Musical groups from Athens, Georgia